Fixation on a Co-Worker is the only studio album by American metalcore band Deadguy, which was released on November 20, 1995 through Victory Records. The album is now considered to have played an important role in the development of the metalcore fusion genre and was included in Decibel Magazine's "Hall of Fame" list in 2006. It is the last recording by the group to feature vocalist Tim Singer and guitarist Keith Huckins.

The album was originally released on compact disc, vinyl, and cassette formats. The LP edition was pressed on grey and black vinyl. 300 LP copies were packaged in special covers, this edition is known as the "Death To False Metal" pressing. In 2013, Victory Records repressed the album on vinyl format, 1048 copies total pressed: 100 clear, 409 pink, 377 red, and 162 yellow.

Track listing

Personnel
Deadguy
Tim Singer - vocals
Chris Corvino - guitar
Keith Huckins - guitar
Tim Naumann - bass
Dave Rosenberg - drums

Production
Steve Evetts - production
Alan Douches - mastering 
Jason Hallman - photography

References

External links
 

Deadguy albums
1995 albums